Cambará do Sul is a municipality in the state of Rio Grande do Sul, Brazil. Its population was approximately 6,406 in 2020. It has an area of approximately 1212 km².

The municipality is one of the coldest in Brazil and sometimes there is the occurrence of snow.

The city is located 185 kilometers from Porto Alegre, at an altitude of 1,031 m, and coordinates latitude 29º02'52" South and longitude 50º08'41" West. Its estimated population in 2005 was 6,682 inhabitants according to the Brazilian Institute of Statistics (IBGE). The Human Development Index (HDI) was 0.76 according to the Atlas of Human Development / UNDP (2000).

The municipality has an area of 1,213 km² and was installed in 1963 from a dismemberment of São Francisco de Paula.

The municipality contains part of the  Tainhas State Park, created in 1975.
In Cambara do Sul are the headquarters of Aparados da Serra National Park and Serra Geral National Park, where several canyons are located, among which the most famous are Itaimbezinho, Fortaleza, Churriado, and Malacara.

The Aparados da Serra National Park is also partly located in the neighboring municipality of Praia Grande, in the state of Santa Catarina
, bathed by Rio do Boi, with numerous waterfalls, of which the main ones are Leite de Moça and Braço Forte.

Cambará do Sul today is a well-organized ecotourism point with several inns, beautiful countryside and mountain climate, registering record low temperatures during the winter, sometimes accompanied by snow.

Gallery

Climate

See also
List of municipalities in Rio Grande do Sul

References

Municipalities in Rio Grande do Sul